Rosati's Authentic Chicago Pizza, doing business as Rosati's Pizza, is an American casual dining restaurant chain specializing in Chicago-style pizza. Its headquarters is in Elgin, Illinois. There are more than 200 locations across the United States, with more than a third of them in Illinois. Rosati's has over $211 million in revenue and was founded in 1926 by Saverio Rosati at the corner of Pulaski and Madison in Chicago's west side. That location closed down and in 1964 reopened in Mount Prospect Illinois. In 1995 Saverio's five sons, Fred, Richard, Al, Bill and Ronald grew the company to be the fourth largest pizza chain in the Chicago area behind Pizza Hut, Domino's and Little Caesars, in 2018 they were listed as number 21 on Pizza Today's list of the top 100 pizzerias.

With an increase of sales in 2019, Rosati's was ranked in the top twenty of Pizza Today's list of "America’s 100 largest pizza chains".

There are two competing restaurant chains using the Rosati's name as the result of "an unfortunate family quarrel".  The original franchise owns the ROSATI'S PIZZA trademark while the splinter chain owns and uses the rosatispizza.com domain name.

References

External links

Rosati's Pizza

Restaurant chains in the United States
Pizza chains of the United States
Pizza franchises
Restaurants established in 1964
American companies established in 1964
Restaurants in Chicago
Food and drink introduced in 1926
Restaurants in Illinois
Companies based in Elgin, Illinois